Memorial Stadium is a stadium on the campus of the University of Illinois Urbana-Champaign in Champaign, Illinois, United States. The stadium, used primarily for football, is a memorial to the university's students who died in World War I; their names are engraved on the nearly 200 pillars surrounding the stadium's façade. With a capacity of 60,670, the stadium is primarily used as the home of the university's Fighting Illini football team.

Construction
In the early 1920s, the old football stadium, Illinois Field, was deemed inadequate. There was some sentiment for retaining the site, but it was too congested to expand the stadium adequately, so a new site was selected, in a largely undeveloped area at the south end of the campus. George Huff and Robert Zuppke were responsible for pushing most of the fundraising for this project.

Memorial Stadium was completed in 1923 at a cost of US$1.7 million, which, adjusted for inflation, is equal to $25.8 million in 2020. Its original U-shaped design borrows some form from the earlier constructed Harvard Stadium. The project's general contractor was English Brothers of Champaign, who are in business to this day. The name was chosen in honor of the dead from World War I. The original construction was financed with donations from University students, alumni and others. At the time, the stadium consisted of double-decked stands on the east and west sidelines. The single-decked horseshoe around the south end zone was later completed, along with a large student section near the north end zone.

According to an archival "campus tours" website, heavy rain during the construction resulted in a bulldozer sinking into the field. It was decided the expense of removing the bulldozer would have been greater than leaving it buried under the field, and it remains there today. However, this has since been disputed as a campus urban legend. Oddly enough, the same myth exists for the University of Michigan Stadium built a few years later, but no evidence has been found to support the rumor.

The bell of the USS Illinois (BB-65), an Iowa-class battleship that was never completed, is on loan to the university and is in use. It is traditionally rung when the Fighting Illini score a touchdown or goal during home games.

Dedication
The stadium is dedicated to the men of the University of Illinois that gave their lives serving in World War I. In 2002, the stadium dedication was extended to those who died in World War II. There are a total of 200 columns on the east and west sides of the stadium.  183 columns display one name of a University of Illinois alum that lost their lives in the first war (182 men and 1 woman).

The stadium was officially dedicated on October 18, 1924, on which the university football team played a homecoming game against the University of Michigan. On way to a 39–14 Illini victory, Red Grange scored five touchdowns in one of the greatest single-game performances in football history.

Tributes

 The football playing surface within the stadium is named Zuppke Field, in honor of Robert Zuppke, the University of Illinois head football coach from 1913 to 1941.
 The north end of Zuppke Field hosts The Grange Rock, a tribute to Red Grange. The tribute was dedicated on October 22, 1994, with Mrs. Margaret Grange, Red Grange's wife, in attendance. The rock came from the same Indiana quarry that produced the stadium's columns.
 In 2009, a  statue of Red Grange was dedicated as the capstone of the stadium's "Illinois Renaissance" renovations.
 The Ray Eliot Varsity Room is named for Ray Eliot, the University of Illinois head football coach from 1942 to 1959.

Capacity

The seating capacity of the stadium's permanent seating, including the north end zone bleachers, is 60,670.  This number was reduced from 62,870 when it was announced on 12 April 2011 that 2,200 south end zone bleacher seats added in 1982 would be removed.  The 62,870 number had been reduced from 69,249 as part of the Illinois Renaissance program which was completed in 2008. The east main holds approximately 18,000 with the east balcony adding 10,000. The west main holds less than 13,000 on the first level plus 5,000 in the balcony. The south end zone "horseshoe" holds nearly 9,800 (12,000 before the removal of the aforementioned 2,200 seats), while the north bleachers add 5,000 more seats.

Attendance Records at Memorial Stadium

Average Attendance since 2001

Past renovations
 A press box was built at the top of the west balcony in 1967.
 As part of the 1974 Golden Anniversary campaign, artificial turf was installed on the field, along with a new lighting system.
 A $7 million renovation began in April 1985. New AstroTurf was installed, along with new football headquarters in the northeast corner of the stadium.
 From November 1991 to August 1992, an $18 million renovation project replaced all concrete bleachers in both the east and west upper decks, along with the top 25 rows of the main stands. New restrooms were built, and the stadium's electrical and drainage systems were upgraded to meet new building codes.
 A color scoreboard was added to the north end of the stadium for the 1994 season.
 The stadium's AstroTurf was replaced with AstroPlay in 2001.
 In the Summer of 2022, the stadium was given a new turf field.

2008 "Illinois Renaissance" renovation

A massive renovation project was unveiled for Memorial Stadium in the fall of 2005. The "Illinois Renaissance" project began after the completion of the 2006 football season, and was completed just days before the 2008 season began. The concourse areas on all four sides of the stadium were improved with better concession and restroom facilities. Additionally, the concourse areas were connected all the way around the stadium for easier passage between the east and west stands. A permanent, 5,000-seat structure was built on the north end of the stadium, and the existing scoreboard and video replay screen was moved to the south end zone. The south horseshoe was planned to be filled in down to field level, and would have completely connected the east and west stands. The horseshoe improvements, which were not implemented, would have increased seating to 14,000 seats behind the south end zone. The capacity of the west stands will be significantly reduced in order to build a large press box and luxury suite area at the top of the balcony. The new boxes will be three levels tall and will extend the entire length of the field. The new capacity of the stadium after the renovation will be 62,143. This $100 million project will be largely paid for by sales of the stadium's new suites and luxury seating in the west stands. The field also got a new FieldTurf playing surface.

Controversy has arisen over the decision to move the bulk of the student section to the north side of the stadium. Some student overflow seating is set aside on the north end of the east stands. The location may hamper the view of the student section when the ball is at the south end of the field. Critics of the plan suggest this is a move to sell the seats currently occupied by the student section at a higher price to the general public. The planners assert that they are trying to make the field noise louder and cater to the student's needs by giving them separate concessions and amenities.

The renovated stadium was rededicated at the 2008 season home opener against Eastern Illinois University on September 6, 2008.

2013 renovation

For the start of the 2013 Fighting Illini season, the athletic department replaced the main scoreboard with a new Daktronics video board that measures . Additionally, the stadium's sound system was updated and two  ribbon video boards were installed along the façade between the upper and lower decks of the stadium's sideline seating.

To recognize the Illinois Fighting Illini football's historical accomplishments, the athletic department also installed new lettering along the outside of the luxury suites and press box. The lettering lists National Championships, Big Ten Championships, Retired Numbers, and also reads Welcome to Memorial Stadium Home of the Fighting Illini.

Future Renovations
On June 25, 2022, Athletic Director Josh Whitman stated during his annual Media Roundtable Press Conference that he plans to further renovate Memorial Stadium in the near future. Whitman stated, “Obviously, the East and South of Memorial Stadium is something that needs attention. In my perfect world, I always wanted to unveil a fully renovated Memorial Stadium in time for the 100th anniversary of its dedication in 2024. At this point, I don't know how likely that is. As we transition into Phase 2, it will be a function of talking through the priorities. Sometimes those priorities are driven in part by donor interest and donor appetite. It happens often where a certain gift materializes and it moves a project from No. 3 to No. 1. That happens all the time."

Other uses
 Memorial Stadium was the site of the 1977 and 1979 NCAA Men's Division I Outdoor Track and Field Championships
 From December 1985 until the Spring of 2000, an inflatable practice dome known as "The Bubble" was inflated over the field, to allow for indoor practice during the winter months. "The Bubble" was replaced by the Irwin Indoor Football Practice Facility in 2001 which is just northeast of the stadium.
 "The Bubble" was also used by the Chicago Bears in 1985 while practicing for Super Bowl XX.
 On September 22, 1985, it hosted the first ever Farm Aid concert.
 It is the site of the field show of the annual Illini Marching Band Festival, hosted by the Marching Illini and usually the largest high school marching band competition in Illinois.
 Since 1999, it has hosted the IHSA football state finals.
 In 2002, the stadium also hosted the NFL's Chicago Bears while Soldier Field was being renovated. The Bears' founder and former Illini Football player George Halas had his team's colors mimic his Alma Mater's school colors.
 Since the marathon's creation in 2009, Memorial Stadium has served as the finish line for the Illinois Marathon, which is held the fourth weekend each April.

Gallery

See also
 List of NCAA Division I FBS football stadiums

References

External links

 
 Memorial Stadium history/timeline
 University of Illinois Memorial Stadium view from above

College football venues
Illinois Fighting Illini football venues
American football venues in Illinois
Buildings and structures in Champaign, Illinois
Buildings and structures of the University of Illinois Urbana-Champaign
Chicago Bears stadiums
Defunct athletics (track and field) venues in the United States
Defunct National Football League venues
Sports venues in Champaign–Urbana, Illinois
Tourist attractions in Champaign County, Illinois
Projects by Holabird & Root
Sports venues completed in 1923
1923 establishments in Illinois